A wind organ is a musical instrument designed to be 'played' by the wind.  Designs of wind organs vary depending on the artist constructing the organ.  Some are made of hollow receptacles that sound as the wind blows across their mouths while others are constructed from taut metal wires that 'sing' when the wind blows against them, similar to the way wire fences vibrate in the wind.

Organs (music)
Wind-activated musical instruments